Maestro is an album by Brazilian composer Moacir Santos recorded in 1972 and released on the Blue Note label.

Reception
The Allmusic review by Jason Ankeny awarded the album 3½ stars stating "For his Blue Note debut, Maestro, Brazilian composer Moacir Santos assiduously avoids his homeland's familiar bossa nova and samba rhythms, instead reinventing lesser-known idioms like baião and frevo to create his own complex yet pulsating signatures and cadences". The All About Jazz review by C. Andrew Hovan said "Without a doubt, Maestro established Santos as an artist to be reckoned with and while the record probably skirted just below the radar of the average jazz listener, two more Blue Notes would be in the offing".

Track listing
All compositions by Moacir Santos except as indicated
 "Nanã" (Santos, Mario Telles, Yanna Cotti)  
 "Bluishmen"   
 "Luanne" (Santos, Jay Livingston, Ray Evans)  
 "Astral Whine (An Elegy to Any War)"   
 "Mother Iracema"   
 "Kermis"   
 "April Child" (Santos, Livingston, Evans)  
 "The Mirror's Mirror" 
Recorded at A&R Studios in Los Angeles, California on September 29 and October 10 & 18, 1972

Personnel
Moacir Santos - baritone saxophone, vocals, percussion, arranger
Oscar Brashear - trumpet
Frank Rosolino - trombone
David Duke - french horn
Ray Pizzi - alto saxophone, soprano saxophone
Don Menza - tenor saxophone, flute
Hymie Lewak - piano
Clare Fischer - organ
Bill Henderson - electric piano
Joe Pass - guitar
John Heard - bass
Sheila Wilkinson - vocals (Wilkerson)
Reggie Andrews - arranger (track 1) 
Harvey Mason - drums  
Carmelo Garcia - percussion

References

Blue Note Records albums
Moacir Santos albums
1972 albums
Albums produced by George Butler (record producer)